Josh Drummond (born 19 April 1983) is a former Australian rules footballer in the Australian Football League who is currently serving as the defensive coach of the Gold Coast Football Club. He was a rebounding defender and occasional wingman, with a long and accurate left-foot kick.

Early life
Dummond was born and raised on the Sunshine Coast in Queensland.

AFL career
He was recruited by the Brisbane Lions through the 2003 rookie draft from the Northern Eagles, after two dominant seasons at centre half back. He won the Eagles Best & Fairest in 2003. He was elevated to the Brisbane Lions senior list in Round 8, 2005 when he made his debut against Adelaide. After missing the early part of 2007 through injury, he became one of the Lions' most important players in 2007, with an impressive ability to hit targets from the kick out.

Josh Drummond's left foot kicks were recognised among the most penetrating and damaging in the AFL. Repeated soft tissue injuries, particularly to his quadriceps, hampered Drummond's career. He also missed a significant amount of football after rupturing his anterior cruciate ligament during the 2010 season necessitating LARS surgery. Ongoing struggle with injury forced Drummond into an early retirement at the end of the 2012 season.

References

External links

Josh Drummond at the Brisbane Lions website 

1983 births
Living people
Sportspeople from the Sunshine Coast
Australian rules footballers from Queensland
Brisbane Lions players
Zillmere Eagles Australian Football Club players